Cwmfelin is a village out the southern outskirts of Maesteg, in the county borough of Bridgend, Wales. It was once part of the medieval commote of Tir Iarll, before becoming a part of the parish of Llangynwyd. Since 1974 it has been part of the community of Llangynwyd Middle.

Villages in Bridgend County Borough